Wadjkare was an ancient Egyptian pharaoh of the Eighth dynasty who reigned c. 2150 BC during the First Intermediate Period. He is considered to be a very obscure figure in Egyptian history.

Identity 
Wadjkare is mentioned only once: in a royal limestone tablet known as Coptos Decree R (Cairo museum; obj. JE 41894), which is said to have been created by the king himself. It contains a list of punishments for everyone who dares to damage or plunder a shrine dedicated to the god Min-of-Coptos. However, from an archaeological standpoint there is nothing else known about this king. His existence is questioned by some scholars, because he is not mentioned in any Ramesside king list.

A rock inscription in Nubia mentions a king that in the past was tentatively read as Wadjkare. It is believed nowadays that the royal name on the inscription is Menkhkare, the throne name of the Eleventh Dynasty local ruler Segerseni.

Scholars such as Farouk Gomaà and William C. Hayes identify the Horus name Djemed-ib-taui with a ruler named Neferirkare and equate Wadjkare with an obscure ruler named Hor-Khabaw. Hans Goedicke sees Wadjkare as the predecessor of Djemed-ib-taui and assigns both rulers to the 9th dynasty.

References

22nd-century BC Pharaohs
Pharaohs of the Eighth Dynasty of Egypt